Nina Breeder (born in 1982 in Genova, Italy), is an Italian contemporary artist based in New York City. She grew up in Northern Italy and lived there until 1991. Later she was relocated to Polperro, UK, for one year where she first met her adoptive brother Massimilian Breeder, who is present in several of her works and future films/video-art collaborations. She studied at Colombo Lyceum for Classic Literature and consequently at the Academy of Art in Florence, Italy.

Background

Back in 1999 N. Breeder began working on experimental films and performances in Florence. She later moved to Brooklyn, where she began collaborating with the artist Massimilian Breeder on film and performance art, beginning the film production of Devil come to Hell and stay where You belong*  and a series of land installations and performances. Her work is based on the confrontation with lost traditions and pagan rituals, often involving the use of hair, wool, feces and organic materials.*

Selected exhibitions

2013

"Relaxation Tapes" – Sound Works Series Vol.1

"Reconstruction of a Body" – Sound Works Series Vol.1

"20 Minutes MRI" – Sound Installation

"Analog Winds" – Winds Sound Design for the film Reservoir by Massimilian Breeder 

'2012

"La Cagna" – Film – Currently in Production

"I am Indigenous to this Place" – Photo Series, Public Installation NYC

2011

"Selected Sound Works" – Tokyo, JP

"Working Bodies" – Photographs

"Human Frames"- Kunst im Tunnel, KIT

2010

"Winter Films" – ongoing film project shot in the Northern Hemisphere.
 
"Identity" – photographic book

"Happy End" – Ausstellung Exhibition, Kunsthalle Göppingen

2009

Devil come to Hell and stay where You Belong: Pera Museum, Istanbul, Turkey

Devil come to Hell and stay where you belong: Centre Georges Pompidou in Paris and Metz, France* 

Freeshout and Pecci Museum, Prato, Italy* 

Anthology Film Archives, New York City* 

"Horse Pistes" – Centre Georges Pompidou, Paris, France

2008

Love is a Burning thing: Darom Art Center, Tel Aviv

Artoteca, Milan, Italy

Copenhagen International Film Festival, Official Selection

Goteburg International Film Festival, Official Selection

2007

The Lunch, Installation and Performance in collaboration with Nina Breeder at Art Space Blanque Monteaux, Paris

Unnatural Selections at Pierogi Gallery, Brooklyn

"Nuit Blanche" – Théâtre des Blancs-Manteaux, Paris, France

2006

Pierogi Gallery at ArtBasel, Miami

2005

Ex-Macelli Freeshout, Prato Italy

"PAM", Chelsea Art Museum, New York City

References
Experimental Cinema* LoWave
Museum of Modern and Contemporary Art* Pompidou Museum
Centre Georges Pompidou* Hors Pistes
Anthology Film Archives, New York City* Anthology Film Archive
The MainPOint* The Main Point
Entrisme Contemporary Art Magazine* Entrisme
Freeshout* Freeshout
Internet Movies Database* IMDB
Wurlitzer Repetitions * 
Pierogi Gallery*

External links
NoCrew* 
TheMainPoint* 
LoWave Experimental Film Label* 
Centre Georges Pompidou* 
Horse Pistes Pompidou* 

Italian film directors
Living people
1979 births
Artists from Genoa
Artists from New York (state)
21st-century Italian women artists
Italian contemporary artists
Film people from Genoa